Georgia School Ningbo (GSN)(乔治亚学校) is an independent international school affiliated with Ningbo Zhicheng School International in the Ningbo city of Zhejiang, China.

International schools in China
Private schools in China
Schools in Zhejiang